The ninth World Cup of Softball was held between July 7–13, 2014 in Irvine, California. The competing national teams was the United States, Japan, Canada, Mexico, the Philippines, Chinese Taipei and Venezuela.

Standings

Schedule
all times PDT

13 July, 2014

6th 7th places

 7-4 

5th 6th places

 0-4 

Bronze medal game

 3-1 

FINAL

 5-2

References

World Cup of Softball
2014 in softball